Karel Koníček is a retired Czechoslovak slalom canoeist who competed in the late 1940s. He won a silver medal in the C-2 team event at the 1949 ICF Canoe Slalom World Championships in Geneva.

References

External links 
 Karel KONICEK at CanoeSlalom.net

Czechoslovak male canoeists
Possibly living people
Year of birth missing
Medalists at the ICF Canoe Slalom World Championships